Ici ARTV is a Canadian television channel devoted to the arts.

ARTV may also refer to:
ARTV (Chile), a cable television channel in Chile
ARtv (Portugal) or Canal Parlamento, a Portuguese legislature television station
ARTv (Sri Lanka), a Sri Lankan English language television channel
Associated-Rediffusion Television, a former British television station